Gotthard Backlund (unknown - unknown) was a Swedish chess player.

Biography
Gotthard Backlund was one of the strongest chess players in Sweden in the 1950s. He played mainly in domestic chess tournaments and Swedish Chess Championships. In 1954, Gotthard Backlund took part in the international chess match with the USSR national chess team.

Gotthard Backlund played for Sweden in the Chess Olympiad:
 In 1956, at fourth board in the 12th Chess Olympiad in Moscow (+3, =4, -4).

Gotthard Backlund participated in chess tournaments until the end of the 1970s.

References

External links

Gotthard Backlund chess games at 365chess.com

Year of birth missing
Year of death missing
Swedish chess players
Chess Olympiad competitors
20th-century chess players